Vyacheslav Nivinskyi (born 31 March 1974) is a retired Ukrainian football player and current coach.

Career
Nivinskyi started to play football in his native city Kyiv. His first professional team was FC Nyva-Borysfen Myronivka. From there he joined the team Nyva Myronivka in the Kyiv Oblast. In July 1995 he moved to Obolon Kyiv. As a member of the Kyiv club, she spent 14 years (with interruptions), where he finished his playing career in 2009. He also played in Azerbaijan for Simurq PIK.

By the number of matches for FC Obolon he ranks the first – 266 matches, in which 13 goals scored.

As a coach Nivinskyi very often co-operated together with Serhiy Kovalets, and in October 2017 he became an assistant manager to Tatran Prešov.

In 2019–2021 he again worked with Serhiy Kovalets in FC Obolon Kyiv and then FC Chornomorets Odesa. In 2021 Nivinskyi accepted an offer to manage the newly formed AFSC Kyiv.

References

External links
 
 

1974 births
Living people
Footballers from Kyiv
Ukrainian footballers
Ukrainian football managers
Ukrainian expatriate footballers
Ukrainian Premier League players
FC Nyva Myronivka players
FC Obolon-Brovar Kyiv players
Expatriate footballers in Azerbaijan
Ukrainian expatriate sportspeople in Azerbaijan
FC Obolon-2 Kyiv players
FC Metalurh Zaporizhzhia players
FC Kryvbas Kryvyi Rih players
Simurq PIK players
FC Obolon-2 Kyiv managers
Ukrainian Second League managers
Association football defenders
Expatriate football managers in Lithuania
Ukrainian expatriate sportspeople in Lithuania
Expatriate football managers in Slovakia
Ukrainian expatriate sportspeople in Slovakia